The Stephen F. Austin State University Press (also known as SFA Press) is a university press affiliated with Stephen F. Austin State University, located in Nacogdoches, Texas. The press publishes both non-fiction and literary worksmost of which focus on the history and culture of East Texas. Stephen F. Austin State University Press is a member of Texas A&M University Press's Texas Book Consortium program.

See also

 List of English-language book publishing companies
 List of university presses

References

External links 
Stephen F. Austin State University Press
SFA Press prize winners

Stephen F. Austin State University Press
Texas